Tonight is an album by France Joli, released in 1980 on the Prelude label. It is well known for the singles "The Heart to Break the Heart" and "Feel Like Dancing".

Track listing
All songs written by Tony Green except where noted.
"The Heart to Break the Heart" (Remix)
"Feel Like Dancing"
"Tough Luck"
"This Time (I'm Giving All I've Got)"(Odette Springer/Susan Minski) US Peak # 103
"When Love Hurts Inside"
"Tonight"
"Stoned in Love"
"The Heart to Break the Heart" (Album version)
"The Heart to Break the Heart" (Instrumental)
"The Heart to Break the Heart" (Radio version)

Personnel
Lead Vocal - France Joli
Additional lead vocal - Tony Green
Strings & Horns Arranged by – Denis Lepage
Girl-group Backing Vocals – Barbara Ingram, Carla Benson, Evette Benton
Bass – Brian Smith
Congas, Percussion, Tambourine – Miguel Fuentes
Drums – Derek Kendrick
Guitar – Tony Green
Harp – Margau Morris
Keyboards – Robby Goldfarb
Producer, Arranged By – Tony Green
Saxophone – Richard Beaudet
Tambourine – Gene Leone
Vibraphone – Jimmi Tanaka

Credits
Written and arranged for Tony Green Organization Records Ltd. 
Mastered at CBS Mastering Labs, NYC, and at Frankford/Wayne Mastering Labs, NYC
Engineer – Claude Allard, Gene Leone
Assistant Engineer – Clark Milioti, Evelyn Hertel, Michael Banghi
Mastered By – Dominick Romeo, Stan Kalina
Mixed By – Gene Leone
Assisted & Mixed By – Tony Green

External links
Tonight by France Joli at Discogs
Tonight by France Joli at AllMusic

1980 albums
France Joli albums
Albums produced by Tony Green